Urness is a surname. Notable people with the surname include:

Ted Urness (1937–2018), American football player
Zoë Marieh Urness (born 1984), Native American photographer

See also
Urnes (disambiguation)
Urness Township, Douglas County, Minnesota

Surnames of Norwegian origin